George "Eppie" Hamilton (1900 - death date unknown) was an American professional baseball catcher in the Negro leagues. He played with several teams from 1923 to 1932, playing mostly with the Memphis Red Sox.

References

External links
 and Baseball-Reference Black Baseball stats and Seamheads

Birmingham Black Barons players
Cleveland Tigers (baseball) players
Memphis Red Sox players
Washington Pilots players
1900 births
Year of death missing
Baseball catchers
Baseball players from Alabama